Med kærlig hilsen (With Love) is a 1971 Danish erotic film written and directed by Gabriel Axel.

Cast
Buster Larsen
Birte Tove
Gabriel Axel
Grethe Holmer
Birgit Brüel
Jørgen Kiil

Edward Fleming

Lily Broberg

Annie Birgit Garde
Bent Christensen
Otto Brandenburg

References

External links

Med kærlig hilsen at the Danish National Filmography

1971 films
1970s erotic films
Films directed by Gabriel Axel
Danish erotic films
1970s Danish-language films